Iowa Farmer Today is a weekly newspaper, based in Cedar Rapids, Iowa, that covers Iowa for crop and livestock farmers in the Midwest. 

Iowa Farmer Today was launched September 8, 1984, at a time when the tremors of the farm crisis were being felt throughout the Midwest. Publisher Steve DeWitt held discussions for several months with the Cedar Rapids Gazette for the need for a publication focused entirely on the issues facing Iowa's farmers. The complicated business of farming and the emotion of the rural lifestyle were not being fully addressed by the ag media in the early 1980s.

Through the 1980s and 1990s and into the new millennium, Iowa Farmer Today has covered presidential elections, shifting farm legislation, droughts and floods, the debt crisis of the early '80s, the commodity price crisis of the late '90s, the ongoing debate surrounding genetically enhanced crops, improvements in equipment, industry consolidation, advances in crop and livestock production and the unique aspects of farm families and lifestyles. The editors are committed to presenting practical, relevant and timely news and information farmers can put to use on their farms. The editorial mix contains stories ranging from global to local in scope, high-tech to nuts-and-bolts, production to politics.

IFT Publications Inc., which includes Iowa Farmer Today, Illinois Farmer Today, Missouri Farmer Today and Midwest Marketer, has a home office in Cedar Rapids, Iowa, with satellite offices in Ankeny, Iowa, Malvern, Iowa, Columbia, Mo., Bloomington, Ill., and Frankfort, Ill. Iowa Farmer Today became a property of Lee Enterprises on July 1, 2004.

References

External links 
 
 Facebook page of Iowa Farmer Today

1984 establishments in Iowa
Agriculture in Iowa
Newspapers published in Iowa
Lee Enterprises publications
Publications established in 1984
Works about agriculture
Weekly newspapers published in the United States
Mass media in Cedar Rapids, Iowa